Nicolai Lorenzoni (born 1 May 1992) is a German-Swiss professional footballer who plays as a left-back for KSV Baunatal.

Career
Lorenzoni played in Switzerland for SV Herten and Basel. In January 2009 he joined SC Freiburg.

He made his first team debut for SC Freiburg on 1 December 2013 in a 1–0 away defeat against Borussia Mönchengladbach. He replaced Francis Coquelin after 82 minutes.

Lorenzeni joined KSV Hessen Kassel from Chemnitzer FC for the 2015–16 season.

References

External links 
 

Living people
1992 births
German people of Swiss descent
Swiss emigrants to Germany
People from Liestal
German footballers
Association football fullbacks
Swiss men's footballers
Germany youth international footballers
SC Freiburg players
Chemnitzer FC players
KSV Hessen Kassel players
TuS Koblenz players
FC Rot-Weiß Erfurt players
Bundesliga players
3. Liga players
Regionalliga players
Sportspeople from Basel-Landschaft